Nănești is a commune located in Vrancea County, Romania. It is composed of three villages: Călienii Noi, Călienii Vechi and Nănești.

References

Communes in Vrancea County
Localities in Western Moldavia